Arno Press was a Manhattan-based publishing house founded by Arnold Zohn in 1963, specializing in reprinting rare and long out-of-print materials.

History
Zohn served 48 missions on a bomber crew during World War II, and when he returned home he entered the publishing world. He became vice-president of The New York Times, and later created his own publishing house, Arno Press, in 1963. From the beginning, Zohn's business strategy was to reprint hardcover volumes of historical works and sell large orders to the then-growing number of libraries around the country. In 1968, The New York Times purchased a controlling 51% of Arno Press, and in 1971 they purchased the rest.

On September 23, 1970, the Carnegie Endowment for International Peace formally presented the United Nations with a five-volume series set, Issues Before the General Assemblies of the United Nations (1946-1965), published by Arno Press. Arnold Zohn attended the ceremony in the General Secretary's conference room on behalf of Arno Press. Joseph E. Johnson represented the Carnegie Endowment in his capacity as president, and Secretary General U Thant accepted the material on behalf of the United Nations.

Herbert Cohen was named president of Arno Press on July 14, 1975, in an announcement by Sydney Gruson, executive vice-president of The New York Times Company. He had previously served as executive vice-president of Arno Press since he joined the company in May 1972, and before that he was with Xerox Corporation's American Education Publications.

The firm continued as part of Times Books in the 1980, reducing its output. In 1982 many of its titles were sold to Merrimack Book Service. The imprint was licensed to Random House in 1984, then to the Henry Holt division of Macmillan in 2000.

The Arno Press imprint was discontinued "around 1984."

Legacy
In their book American Woman, Italian Style: Italian Americana's Best Writings on Women, Carol Bonomo Albright and Christine Palamidessi Moore praised Arno Press for the "impressive and valuable array of materials on Italian Americans in the United States" in its thirty-nine-volume series, The Italian American Experience.

Princeton English Professor Autumn Womack notes that Arno Press embarked on "landmark republication project, The American Negro: His History and Literature" which "reissued hundreds of titles by and about Black life" between 1968-1971.

Selected book series
 Abercrombie & Fitch Library
 Addiction in America: Drug Abuse & Alcoholism
 Afro-American Culture Series (Series editor: Ulysses Lee)
 America and the Holy Land
 America in Two Centuries: An Inventory 
 American Business Abroad: Origins and Development of the Multinational Corporation (Advisor editor: Stuart Bruchey)
 American Education: Its Men, Ideas & Institutions Series
 American Ethnic Groups Series
 American Farmers and the Rise of Agribusiness
 The American Immigration Collection
 American Journalists Series
 American Labor: From Conspiracy to Collective Bargaining
 The American Military Experience
 American Negro: His History and Literature (140 vols.). (General editor: William Loren Katz.) Joint publisher: The New York Times.
 American Woman: Images and Realities
 Ancient Economic History
 The Anti-Slavery Crusade in America (70 vols.)
 Architectural Treasures of Early America (Series editors: Russell F. Whitehead and Frank Chouteau Brown)
 Arno Series of Contemporary Art
 Aspects of Film (Advisor editor: Garth S. Jowett)
 Asian Experience in North America Series
 Best Plays Series
 Bestseller Society series
 Big Business: Economic Power in a Free Society
 British Labour Struggles: Contemporary Pamphlets 1727-1850
 The Chicano Heritage Series
 Children and Youth: Social Problems and Social Policy
 Classics in Psychology Series
 Classics in Psychiatry series
 Committee for Economic Development Research Studies
 The Complete Book of Basketball: A New York Times Scrapbook History Series
 Cookery Americana
 The Development of Public Land Law in the United States
 The Development of Science: Sources for the History of Science
 Dissertations in European Economic History
 Dissertations on Film
 Dissertations on Sociology (Advisory editors: Harriet Zuckerman and Robert K. Merton)
 The Eastern Europe Collection (Advisory editor: Harry Schwartz)
 Essay Index Reprint Series
 European Political Thought series (Advisory editor: J. P. (Jacob Peter) Mayer)
 Eyewitness Accounts of the American Revolution
 Family in America
 The Far Western Frontier
 The First American Frontier Series
 Flight : Its First Seventy-Five Years
 Foreign Travelers in America 1810-1935
 Foundation of Thanatology: Arno Press Continuing Series on Thanatology
 The German Air Force in World War II
 Gold: Historical and Economic Aspects
 Golf Digest Classics 
 The Great Contemporary Issues Series
 Greek History Series
 Greek Texts and Commentaries
 Historical Issues in Mental Health
 History of Accounting Series
 History of Broadcasting: Radio to Television
 History of Ecology Series
 History of Geology Series
 History of Ideas in Ancient Greece
 History of Paleontology
 History, Philosophy and Sociology of Science
 Homosexuality: Lesbians and Gay Men in Society, History, and Literature (Series editor: Jonathan Katz)
 International Finance (Advisory editor: Mira Wilkins)
 The Irish-Americans Series
 The Italian American Experience (39 vols.)
 International Labour Office: Studies and Reports
 The Leisure Class in America (Advisory editor: Leon Stein)
 Literature and History of Aviation (Advisory editor: James Gilbert)
 The Literature of Cinema (Advisory editor: Martin S. Dworkin)
 The Literature of Death and Dying
 Literature of Mystery & Detection Series
 The Literature of Photography
 Lost Race and Adult Fantasy Fiction  
 Mass Violence in America Series
 Medicine and Society in America Series
 Mental Illness and Social Policy: The American Experience
 Metropolitan America
 The Mexican American
 Mid-American Frontier Collection (Advisory editor: Jerome O. Steffen)
 The Middle East Collection
 Modern Jewish Experience Series
 Morals and Law in Ancient Greece
 Museum of Modern Art Reprints
 National Bureau of Economic Research Publications in Reprint series
 Natural Sciences in America
 Navies and Men
 News in Print Series (Series editors: Mitchell Rapoport and Nancy Volkman)
 The New York Times Film Reviews
 Opera Biographies
 Perspectives in Psychical Research Series
 The Physically Handicapped in Society
 Physician Travelers
 Police in America
 Popular Culture in America, 1800-1925 Series
 Poverty U.S.A.: The Historical Record
 Public Health in America
 Publications of the Continuing Seminar on World Jewry
 Publications of the Institute of the History of Medicine: The Johns Hopkins University
 The Puerto Rican Experience Series
 The Railroads
 Religion in America
 Research Library of Colonial Americana (General editor: Richard C. Robey)
 Right Wing Individualist Tradition in America Series
 Russia Observed
 Science Fiction   
 Select Bibliographies Reprint Series
 Selected Works of Anthony Trollope
 Sex, Marriage and Society
 Short Story Index Reprint Series
 Social Problems and Social Policy : The American Experience
 Social Science Studies series
 Sources of Modern Photography Series
 Studies in Roman History
 Supernatural and Occult Fiction    
 Tate Gallery Publications
 Technology and Society Series
 The Use & Abuse of America's Natural Resources Series
 United States Air Force Historical Studies
 Utopian Literature Series 
 Vietnam Studies
 World Affairs, National and International Viewpoints
 World Food Supply
 Zoological Series

Selected publications
Books
Belknap, Jeremy. A History of New-Hampshire (1972)  Originally published 1791–92. A title in the Research Library of Colonial Americana series.
Birnbaum, Norman. Social Structure and the German Reformation (1980) . A title in the Dissertations on Sociology series.
Board of Governors, Federal Reserve. International Monetary Policies (1979)  Originally published 1947. A title in the International Finance series.
Crowninshield, Frank. Manners for the Metropolis (1975)  A title in The Leisure Class in America series
Davies, Robert Bruce. Peacefully Working to Conquer the World: Singer Sewing Machines in Foreign Markets, 1854-1920 (1976) Originally presented as author's thesis at University of Wisconsin, 1967. A title in the series American Business Abroad: Origins and Development of the Multinational Corporation.
Forter, Norman L. The Roumanian Handbook (1971)  A title in The Eastern Europe Collection series.
Guardians of the Poor. A Compilation of the State of Pennsylvania, from the Year 1700 to 1788, Inclusive: The Guardians of the Poor (1971)  Originally published 1788. A title in the Poverty U.S.A.: The Historical Record series.
Hall, Charles E. Negroes in the United States, 1920-1932 (1969), a title in The American Negro: His History and Literature series
Farmer, John Stephen. Slang and its Analogues (1970) Originally published 1890–1904.
Kemmerer, Edwin Walter. Gold and the Gold Standard (1979)  Originally published 1944. A title in the International Finance series.
Wallace, Lewis. Ben Hur, A Tale of the Christ (1977)  Originally published 1880.
Mason, Edward Sagendorph. Controlling World Trade: Cartels and Commodity Agreements (2nd edition, 1972)  Originally published 1946 by the Committee for Economic Development. A title in the World Affairs, National and International Viewpoints series. The first edition Arno Press edition was in its Committee for Economic Development. Research Study series.
Petrie, W. M. Flinders. Religion and Conscience in Ancient Egypt: Lectures Delivered at University College, London (1980)  Originally published 1898.
Read, James Morgan. Atrocity Propaganda, 1914-1919 (1972)  Originally published for the University of Louisville by Yale University Press, 1941.
Real Estate Record Association. History of Real Estate, Building, and Architecture in New York City During the Last Quarter of a Century (1967)
Stabler, Elizabeth (ed.). Key Issues: Issues and Events of 1978 from the New York Times Information Bank (1978). A title in the News in Print Series.
U.S. Congress, Committee on Education. Motion Picture Commission (1978). A title in the Aspects of Film series.

References

External links
A list of publications.
Arno Press at OpenLibrary
 Books by Arno Press at HathiTrust
 Books by Arno Press at Internet Archive

Publishing companies established in 1963
1963 establishments in New York City
Companies based in Manhattan
Book publishing companies based in New York City